Mir Amir Khan I, Amir Khan I was the title of Mir Abul Wafa the eldest son of Mir Qasim Khan Namkiu. He was a nobleman in the time of the Mughal emperors Jahangir and Shah Jahan. At the time of his death he was Subedar or governor of Thatta where he died 1647 in aged more than 100 years. Previously, he was Mughal governor of Gujarat and Bihar.

See also
Tahir Muhammad Thattvi
Mir Ahmed Nasrallah Thattvi

Mughal nobility
1647 deaths